Kannu is a village in Võru Parish, Võru County in southeastern Estonia. Kannu has a population of 29 and an area of 4.4 km².

The village has a bust stop and a lake called Jõrõssuu järv.

References

Villages in Võru County